Allan Bertil Almqvist (29 August 1902 – 16 May 1972), nicknamed Bertila and Trallgöken, was a Swedish writer and illustrator.

Information
He is famous for his World War II-era En svensk tiger propaganda poster (which was one of the most recognized symbols in Sweden around this time period) as well as his children's book series, later comic, Barna Hedenhös (The Stone Age Kids Discover America, The Stones Explore Britain). Almqvist studied literature in Stockholm and Uppsala from 1924 until 1925.

See also

Swedish literature

References

External links
Comic sample

1902 births
1972 deaths
People from Solna Municipality
Writers from Uppland
Swedish male writers
Swedish children's writers
Swedish comics writers
Swedish illustrators